This is a list of notable past and present residents of the U.S. city of Arlington, Texas, and its surrounding metropolitan area. For a list of people whose only connection to Arlington is from the University of Texas, see: List of University of Texas at Arlington people.

Athletics

Ed Appleton - was a Major League Baseball Pitcher who played for the Brooklyn Robins 
Aldrich Bailey - sprinter
Reggie Barnes - professional football player
Ronnie Coleman - 8-time Mr. Olympia bodybuilding champion
Ryan Considine - professional football player
Cade Cunningham - professional basketball player
Scott Cross - college basketball coach
Chris Davis - professional baseball player
Moses Ehambe - professional basketball player
Aaron Fairooz - professional football player
Myles Garrett - professional football player
Vickie Gates - bodybuilder
Jaime Gomez - professional golfer
Reggie Harrell - professional football player
Jeff Horton - football coach
Kenny Iwebema - professional football player
Bobby Iwuchukwu - professional football player
Fred Jackson - professional football player
Luke Joeckel - professional football player
Kyron Johnson - professional football player
Seth Jones - professional hockey player
Jaynie Krick - professional baseball player (AAGPBL)
Sean Lowe - professional baseball pitcher
Chris Martin - professional baseball pitcher
Angela Maxwell - figure skater
Mike McClendon - professional baseball pitcher
Jim McElreath - professional racecar driver
Scott McGarrahan - professional football player
Craig Monroe - professional baseball player
Emmanuel Mudiay - professional basketball player
Ty Nsekhe - professional football player
Chris Odom - professional football player
Betty Pariso - IFBB professional bodybuilder
Hunter Pence - professional baseball player
Lenzy Pipkins - professional football player
Quinn Sharp - professional football player
Lee Shepherd - professional racecar driver
Tommy Spinks - professional football player
Lane Taylor - professional football player
Stepfan Taylor - professional football player
Rich Thompson - professional baseball pitcher
Todd Van Poppel - professional baseball pitcher
Val Joe Walker - professional football player
Jeremy Wariner - track athlete
Mitch Willis - professional football player
Brandon Workman - professional baseball pitcher

Business

Blake Mycoskie - entrepreneur, author, and philanthropist
David A. Sampson -  CEO of the Property Casualty Insurers Association of America

Literature

Elizabeth Bruenig - journalist and author 
Ben Rappaport - author and game designer

Movies, television, and media

Judith Barrett - actress
Corinne Bohrer - actress
Mark Britten - comedian
Taylor Cole - actress
Corby Davidson - radio personality
James Duff - screenwriter
Todd Haberkorn - actor
Todrick Hall - performer, singer
Kristi Kang - voice actress
Lauren Lane - actress
Billy Miller - actor
Jonathan Murphy - actor
Stacey Oristano - actress
Hayley Orrantia - actress, singer and songwriter
Madison Pettis - actress
Ben Rappaport - actor
Chris Sheffield - actor
Jennifer Stone - actress
Emily Warfield - actress

Music

Dimebag Darrell - musician, founding member of Pantera
 Mitch Grassi - singer, founding member of Pentatonix and Superfruit
Mickey Guyton - country singer
Cas Haley - musician/singer
Scott Hoying - singer, founding member of Pentatonix and Superfruit
Melissa Lawson - country singer
Kirstin Maldonado - singer, founding member of Pentatonix
Maren Morris - country singer
Vinnie Paul - musician, founding member of Pantera, Damageplan and Hellyeah
Lacey Sturm - singer-songwriter
Tay-K singer/songwriter, rapper, convicted murderer
B.J. Thomas - musician/singer

Politics

Leo Berman - former member, Texas House of Representatives, from Smith County; former Arlington resident
Robert Cluck - former mayor of Arlington
Les Eaves - Republican member of the Arkansas House of Representatives; former Arlington resident
Chris Harris - member, both houses of the Texas legislature
Shannon McGauley - co-founder, Texas Minutemen
Diane Patrick - member, Texas House of Representatives, 2007-2015
Mark M. Shelton - former member, Texas House of Representatives
SJ Stovall - mayor of Arlington
Tony Tinderholt - District 94 state representative
Tom Vandergriff - member, U.S. House of Representatives, former mayor of Arlington
Bill Zedler - member, Texas House of Representatives

Miscellaneous

Joe Exotic - zoo operator and convicted felon
Amber Hagerman - kidnapping and murder victim
Terry Hornbuckle - criminal
David Williams - professional poker player

References

List of notable residents
Arlington, notable residents
Arlington